Groton is the primary village and a census-designated place (CDP) in the town of Groton, Caledonia County, Vermont, United States. As of the 2020 census, the CDP had a population of 419, out of 984 in the entire town of Groton.

Groton village is in southern Caledonia County, in the southeast corner of the town of Groton, along U.S. Route 302, which leads southeast  to Wells River and southwest  to Barre. The Wells River flows through the village, running southeast to the Connecticut River at the village of Wells River.

References 

Populated places in Caledonia County, Vermont
Census-designated places in Caledonia County, Vermont
Census-designated places in Vermont